At the Battle of Beran Byrig or Beranburh the West Saxons are said to have defeated the Britons at Barbury Castle Hill Fort near Swindon in the year 556.

The Anglo-Saxon Chronicle entry for the year states:  (This year Cynric and Ceawlin fought with the Britons at Beranbury).

Control of Barbury Castle is likely to have been important as it lies on The Ridgeway, a strategic communication route.

References
Swindon Borough Council

External links
 

Beran Byrig
Beran Byrig
Beran Byrig
556
6th century in England
Beran Byrig